The Molière was an international train operated by SNCF, initially linking Paris and Düsseldorf. The train was named after Jean Baptiste Poquelin, using his stage name.

Trans Europ Express
The Molière was the successor of Paris-to-Düsseldorf section of the TEE Paris–Ruhr, on the same route and schedule. The name Paris–Ruhr was no longer accurate because the deletion of the Düsseldorf-to-Dortmund section in 1971 meant that the train no longer served the Ruhr. 

On 1 June 1975 the route was shortened further, to Cologne, resulting in a length just under the economic optimal distance of 500 km. From 28 May 1978 the Molière called in St. Quentin in both directions. On 1 October 1978 the weekend services were scrapped, and on 26 May 1979 the Molière made its last journey as a TEE.

D train
On 27 May 1979 the Molière was continued as two-class D-train on the same schedule as the TEE. The train consisted of SNCF Corail coaches. In 1980 the train was upgraded to InterCity with train numbers IC 430,431. In May 1983 the route was extended to Copenhagen, conveying sleeping and couchette coaches. This nighttrain became the numbers D 430,431 calling at: København H – Naestved – Nykøbing – Rødby Færge – Puttgarden – Lübeck – Hamburg – Bremen – Osnabrück – Münster – Hamm – Dortmund – Bochum – Essen – Duisburg – Düsseldorf – Köln – Aachen – Verviers – Liège-G. – Namur – Charleroi-Sud – Maubeuge – St. Quentin – Paris-Nord. In May 1986 the route was shortened to Cologne - Paris again, so only a day service remained.

EuroCity
On 31 May 1987 the Molière was upgraded to EuroCity status. The EC service was initially allocated train numbers EC 40 and EC 41, and the northern terminus became Dortmund instead of Düsseldorf. According to the EuroCity scheduling, the train was part of a trio. Together with EC Gustave Eiffel and EC Parsifal it provided three EC services daily in each direction between Paris and the Ruhr.

On 23 May 1993 the train was renumbered to EC 30,31. On 14 December 1997 the Molière was replaced by the Paris – Cologne Thalys service.

References

Works cited

External links

International named passenger trains
Named passenger trains of Germany
Named passenger trains of Belgium
Named passenger trains of France
Trans Europ Express
Railway services introduced in 1973
Railway services discontinued in 1997